The Abraham Initiatives is a non-profit organization based in Lod (Israel), New York City and London. Named after the common ancestor of both Jews and Arabs, Abraham. According to its website, it "strives to fulfill the promise of full and equal citizenship and complete equality of social and political rights for Israel’s Jewish and Arab citizens".

History 
Founded in 1989 by the late Alan B. Slifka and the late Dr. Eugene Weiner, the Abraham Initiatives was one of the first nonprofit organizations dedicated to furthering coexistence between Israel's Arab and Jewish citizens.

Special campaigns 
The Abraham Initiatives has implemented a number of stand-alone campaigns aimed at fostering greater tolerance in Israeli society between the Arab and Jewish populations and responding to key issues as they arise. Examples of these include the Yom Kippur-Eid al-Adha Tolerance Campaign. In 2014 and 2015 the major Jewish and Islamic Holy Days of Yom Kippur and Eid al-Adha coincided. This concurrence rarely happens, approximately every 33 years, and in Israel has the potential to spark unrest as a result of the very different traditions associated with these religious days. Yom Kippur is a somber day of fasting and introspection, and Eid al-Adha is a joyous celebration. Furthermore, in Israel, even though the Jewish population is aware of the timing and basic customs of Ramadan, it is generally unaware of Eid el-Adha and could misinterpret the celebrations as provocations. The Abraham Initiatives worked to raise awareness to this concurrence. This was done through various actions. In 2014 – a large conference which hosted both Chief Rabbis of Israel and major Muslim leaders and a series of newspaper adverts in the Hebrew and Arabic media. In 2015 – Joining forces with the Israeli collage artist Hanoch Piven, The Abraham Initiatives created a short animated clip which was screened on Israeli TV channels and on social media. The animation was narrated in both Arabic and Hebrew by well-known Israeli celebrities Mira Awad (who also sits on the Board of Directors of the Abraham Initiatives) and Alon Neuman.

References

External links
 Official site

Organizations established in 1989
Non-profit organizations based in New York City
Arab citizens of Israel
Organizations based in Jerusalem
1989 establishments in Israel
Organisations based in London